The List of Florida hurricanes encompasses approximately 500 tropical or subtropical cyclones that affected the state of Florida. More storms hit Florida than any other U.S. state, and since 1851 only eighteen hurricane seasons passed without a known storm impacting the state. Collectively, cyclones that hit the region have resulted in over 10,000 deaths, most of which occurred prior to the start of hurricane hunter flights in 1943. Additionally, the cumulative impact from the storms has totalled over US$216.1 billion in damage (2018 dollars), primarily from Hurricane Andrew, Hurricane Irma and Hurricane Michael in the 1992, 2017, and 2018 seasons respectively. The most recent hurricane to make landfall in Florida was Nicole in  2022.

Climatology

Tropical cyclones have affected Florida in every month of the year with the exceptions of January and March. Nearly one-third of the cyclones affected the state in September, and nearly three-fourths of the storms affected the state between August and October, which coincides with the peak of the hurricane season. Portions of the coastline have return periods, or expected time between hurricane strikes of a certain intensity or category within 86 mi (139 km) of a given location, that are the lowest in the country. Monroe County was struck by 26 hurricanes since 1926, which is the greatest total for any county in the United States.

In a Monthly Weather Review paper published in 1934, the U.S. Weather Bureau recognized Key West and Pensacola as the most hurricane-prone cities in the state; Key West experiences both storms developing from the western Atlantic Ocean and the Caribbean, while Pensacola has received hurricanes crossing the state as well as storms recurving in the northern Gulf of Mexico. Officially, the earliest hurricane to affect the state was Hurricane Alma on June 9; the latest, Hurricane Kate on November 21. However, preliminary reanalysis suggests that a hurricane may have struck the state on May 28, 1863.

The strongest tropical cyclone to make landfall on the state was the 1935 Labor Day hurricane, which crossed the Florida Keys with a pressure of 892 mbar (hPa; 26.35 inHg); it is also the strongest hurricane on record to strike the United States. Out of the ten most intense landfalling United States hurricanes, four struck Florida at peak strength.

Pre-1900 

The first recorded tropical cyclone to affect the area that is now the state of Florida occurred in 1523, when two ships and their crews were lost along the western coastline. A total 159 hurricanes are known to have affected the state prior to 1900, which collectively resulted in at least 6,504 fatalities and monetary damage of over $102 million (2017 dollars). Additionally, at least 109 boats or ships were either driven ashore, wrecked, or damaged due to the storms. A strong hurricane struck northwest Florida on May 28, 1863, and is the earliest landfall during the year known in the US, pending reanalysis.

Information is sparse for earlier years due to limitations in tropical cyclone observation, though as coastlines became more populated, more data became available. The National Hurricane Center recognizes the uncertainty in both the death tolls and the dates of the events.

1900–1949 

In the period between 1900 and 1949, 108 tropical cyclones affected the state, which collectively resulted in about $4.5 billion (2017 dollars) in damage. Additionally, tropical cyclones in Florida were directly responsible for about 3,500 fatalities during the period, most of which were from the 1928 Okeechobee hurricane. The 1947 season was the year with the most tropical cyclones affecting the state, with a total of six systems. The 1905, 1908, 1913, 1927, 1931, 1942, and 1943 seasons were the only years during the period in which a storm did not affect the state.

The strongest hurricane to hit the state during the period was the 1935 Labor Day hurricane, which is the strongest hurricane on record to strike the United States. Several other major hurricanes struck the state during the period, including the 1926 Miami hurricane, the 1928 Okeechobee hurricane, and several Category 4 hurricanes in the period 1945–50.

1950–1974 

In the period between 1950 and 1974, 85 tropical or subtropical cyclones impacted the state, which collectively resulted in about $7 billion (2017 dollars) in damage, primarily from Hurricanes Donna and Dora. Additionally, the storms were directly responsible for 93 fatalities and indirectly for 23 more deaths. Several tropical cyclones produced over 20 inches (500 mm) of rainfall in the state, including Hurricane Easy, which is the highest total during the period. The 1969 season was the year with the most tropical cyclones affecting the state, with a total of eight systems. The 1954 and 1967 seasons were the only years during the period in which a storm did not affect the state.

The strongest hurricane to hit the state during the period was Hurricane Donna, which was the tenth strongest hurricane on record to strike the contiguous United States. Additionally, Hurricanes Easy, King, Betsy, and Alma hit or otherwise impacted the state as major hurricanes.

1975–1999 

In the period between 1975 and 1999, 83 tropical or subtropical cyclones affected the state, which collectively resulted in $51.1 billion (2017 dollars) in damage, primarily from Hurricane Andrew, and 54 direct casualties. The 1985 season was the year with the most tropical cyclones affecting the state, with a total of eight systems. Every year included at least one tropical cyclone affecting the state. The strongest hurricane to hit the state during the period was Hurricane Andrew, which was one of only four Category 5 hurricanes to strike the United States. Andrew, at the time, was the costliest tropical cyclone in United States history and remains the seventh-costliest. Additionally, Hurricanes Eloise, Elena, and Opal hit or otherwise impacted the state as major hurricanes.

2000–present 
 

Collectively, cyclones in Florida over that period resulted in over $123 billion in damage, most of it from Hurricane Irma. Additionally, tropical cyclones in Florida were responsible for 145 direct fatalities and at least 92 indirect ones during the period. Eight cyclones affected the state in both 2004 and 2005, which were the years with the most tropical cyclones impacting the state. Every year included at least one tropical cyclone affecting the state.

The strongest hurricane to hit the state during the period was Michael, which made landfall in Florida as a Category 5 hurricane–the strongest since Andrew in 1992. Additionally, hurricanes Charley, Ivan, Jeanne, Dennis, Wilma, Irma, and Ian made landfall on or otherwise impacted the state as major hurricanes.

Florida major hurricanes
The following major hurricanes either made landfall on the state as a major hurricane or brought winds of Category 3  status to the state. For storms that made landfall twice or more, the maximum sustained wind speed, and hence the highest Saffir–Simpson category, at the strongest landfall is listed. Only landfalls at major hurricane intensity are listed. Storms are listed since 1851, which is the official start of the Atlantic hurricane database. Originally, hurricanes were classified by central pressure in the 20th century; however, modern practices quantify storm intensities by maximum sustained winds. United States hurricanes are still classified by central pressure from 1971 to 1979; therefore, the maximum sustained winds in the Atlantic hurricane database (HURDAT) are utilized for storms from 1971 to 1979, since this period has not been reanalyzed by the Atlantic hurricane reanalysis project.

Strongest and most intense

Monthly statistics

Deadliest storms

See also

 Atlantic hurricane
 Climate of Florida
 Atlantic hurricane season
 List of Atlantic hurricanes
 List of wettest known tropical cyclones in Florida
 Tropical cyclone

References

Further reading

Atlantic hurricanes
Lists of tropical cyclones in the United States
 
Hurricanes